King's Highway 50, commonly referred to as Highway 50, was a provincially maintained highway in the Canadian province of Ontario. The highway, which was decommissioned in 1998, is still referred to as Highway 50, though it is now made up of several county and regional roads: Peel Regional Road 50, York Regional Road 24 and Simcoe County Road 50. The route began in the north end  corner of the former Etobicoke (today part of Toronto) at Highway 27 as Albion Road, and travelled northwest to Highway 89 west of the town of Alliston. En route, it passed through the villages of Bolton, Palgrave and Loretto. The road south of Bolton has become more suburban as development has encroached from the east and west; but despite this increased urbanization, the removal of highway status, and the fact that it runs through the former Albion Township, the Albion Road name has not been extended to follow it outside Toronto.

Highway 50 was designated in 1936, connecting the western terminus of Highway 49 with Bolton. One year later, it was extended both north and south to Highway 9 and Highway 7, respectively. In 1962, the route was extended south to Highway 27 in Toronto. A final extension was designated in 1976, extending the highway north to Highway 89. In 1997 and 1998, the entire route was transferred to regional governments, decommissioning the designation.

Route description 
Highway 50 began at Highway 27 in Etobicoke, following Albion Road in a northwesterly direction. As far as Steeles Avenue, it was maintained as a connecting link with Metropolitan Toronto, bearing little resemblance to the rural highway north of the city.

The former route of Highway 50 begins as an urban arterial road; as the northwesternmost part of Albion Road. Unlike most other major roads in Toronto, it travels diagonally through the road grid. At Steeles, the road curves north and serves as the boundary between Brampton to the west and Vaughan to the east, in the regions of Peel and York, respectively, following an alignment that divides the concession road grids of both regional municipalities but follows neither. North of the former Highway 7 (named Queen Street on the Brampton side), the road passes to the east of the former hamlet of Ebenezer and then west of the Canadian Pacific Railway Vaughan Intermodal Facility, a large rail yard. At Mayfield Road (Peel Regional Road 14), which serves as the Brampton and Caledon boundary, the route curves northwest to align to the Peel regional road grid as it turns to run entirely within that region, and enters the village of Bolton, where it is named Queen Street.

North of Bolton, the road enters a rural stretch, where it divides two golf courses and provides access to Albion Hills Conservation Area. Shortly thereafter it enters the village of Palgrave, veering to the west to avoid a pond. North of Palgrave, the road is mostly rural, surrounded by open farmland; to the west is Palgrave Conservation Area. The road meets Highway 9 and curves northward, entering Simcoe County. It travels straight through the small hamlet of Loretto on its final leg northward. The former highway ends at Highway 89, west of Alliston, the location of a Honda Manufacturing plant.

History 
Highway 50 between Steeles Avenue and Bolton was originally part of a historic road named Indian Line, that continued the future highway's course south of the junction of Albion Road in Claireville, prior to the southern portion of Indian Line being rerouted and subsequently subsumed into Highway 427. It was first assumed by the Department of Highways as part of the King's Highway network in 1936, connecting Highway 49 with Bolton. On August 12, 1936, the  route was designated.
One year later, on August 11, 1937, the route was extended north to Highway 9. On October 6, it was extended south to Highway 7 along the York–Peel boundary.

Highway 50 was downloaded, a process that transfers responsibility for funding and maintenance of a highway to the various jurisdictions it resided within, beginning on April 1, 1997. On that day, the section between Steeles Avenue and Highway 7 was transferred to the joint jurisdiction of the Regional Municipalities of York and Peel, and the connecting link agreement with the Town of Caledon through downtown Bolton repealed. The road was designated Regional Road 24 on July 10, 1997,
but renumbered as Regional Road 50 on March 26, 1998.
York Region did not follow suit with this change, and so the road is still designated as Regional Road 24 by their Public Works Department.
The remaining section of Highway 50 north of Highway 7 was transferred to the regions of York and Peel and the County of Simcoe on January 1, 1998,
decommissioning the designation entirely. A final transfer took place on August 13, 1998 between the Town of Caledon and Region of Peel, when the former connecting link through Bolton was assumed by Peel Region.
Simcoe County has since designated its portion of the former highway as County Road 50.

Major intersections

References 

50
Roads in Brampton